Marie-Louise Bauchot (born 1928) is a French ichthyologist and assistant manager of the National Museum of Natural History, France.

Taxon described by her
See :Category:Taxa named by Marie-Louise Bauchot

Selected publications
 Status of Abudefduf sexfasciatus (Lacépède), a Pomacentrid Fish from the Indo-West Pacific (in Ichthyological Notes) Gerald R. Allen; Marie-Louise Bauchot; Martine Desoutter Copeia, Vol. 1978, 2. (May 5, 1978), pp. 328–30.
 Marie-Louise Bauchot, Jacques Daget & Roland Bauchot, « Ichthyology in France at the Beginning of the 19th Century : The 'Histoire Naturelle des Poissons' of Cuvier (1769-1832) and Valenciennes (1794-1865) », in Collection building in ichthyology and herpetology (PIETSCH T.W.ANDERSON W.D., dir. ; American Society of Ichthyologists and Herpetologists : 27–80), 1997 ((
Blache, J. and M.-L. Bauchot, 1972  Contribution à la connaissance des poissons Anguilliformes de la côte occidentale d'Afrique. 13e note: les genres Verma, Apterichthus, Ichthyapus, Hemerorhinus, Caecula, Dalophis avec la description de deux genres nouveaux (Fam. des Ophichthidae). Bulletin de l'Institut Francais d'Afrique Noire (Sér A) Sciences Naturelles v. 34 (no. 3): 692-773.

>Bauchot-Boutin, M.-L., 1953 (July) Révision synoptique du genre Serrivomer (Anguilliformes). Bulletin du Muséum National d'Histoire Naturelle (Série 2) v. 25 (no. 4): 365-367.

Bauchot, M.-L. and A. L. Maugé, 1980 (31 Dec.)  Muraenichthys erythraeensis n. sp. de mer Rouge et première mention de Muraenichthys laticaudata (Ogilby, 1897) en mer Rouge (Pisces, Anguilliformes, Ophichthidae). Bulletin du Museum National d'Histoire Naturelle Ser. 4: Section A: Zoologie, Biologie et Écologie Animales v. 2 (no. 3): 933-939.

Taxon named in her honor 
The species of eel Ariosoma bauchotae Karrer, 1983 is named after her.
The comb-tooth blenny Microlipophrys bauchotae (Wirtz & Bath, 1982) is named after her.

References

Living people
1928 births
French ichthyologists
20th-century French biologists